Synchlora herbaria is a moth in the family Geometridae first described by Johan Christian Fabricius in 1794. It is found in Florida, Cuba, Hispaniola, Puerto Rico, the Bahamas, Antigua, Dominica and the Virgin Islands.

The wingspan is about 13 mm.

The larvae have been recorded feeding on Lantana camara.

Subspecies
Synchlora herbaria herbaria (Florida, Cuba, Hispaniola, Puerto-Rico)
Synchlora herbaria bonhotei (Prout, 1912) (Bahamas)
Synchlora herbaria dorsuaria Prout, 1912 (Antigua)
Synchlora herbaria intacta (Warren, 1905) (Dominica)
Synchlora herbaria sanctaecrucis (Prout, 1932) (Virgin Islands)

References

Moths described in 1794
Synchlorini